Jonas Rapp (born 16 July 1994) is a German racing cyclist, who currently rides for UCI Continental team .

Major results
2015
 7th Road race, National Under–23 Road Championships
2016
 8th Overall Oberösterreichrundfahrt
 9th Time trial, National Under–23 Road Championships
2017
 4th Overall Oberösterreichrundfahrt
 4th Duo Normand
2018
 4th Overall Oberösterreichrundfahrt
 6th Overall Baltyk–Karkonosze Tour
 9th GP Kranj
2019
 1st  Overall Tour of Szeklerland
 7th Visegrad 4 Kerekparverseny
2021
 1st  Overall Giro del Friuli Venezia Giulia
1st Stage 2 
 8th Overall Sibiu Cycling Tour
 9th Overall Tour of Małopolska
 10th Overall Belgrade–Banja Luka
2022
 2nd GP Vipava Valley & Crossborder Goriška
 4th Overall Belgrade Banjaluka

References

External links
 

1994 births
Living people
German male cyclists
People from Donnersbergkreis
Cyclists from Rhineland-Palatinate